The Headless Horseman is a 1922 American silent film adaption of Washington Irving's 1820 short story "The Legend of Sleepy Hollow" directed by Edward D. Venturini. It stars Will Rogers, Lois Meredith (in her last major on-screen appearance), and Ben Hendricks Jr. It was the first panchromatic black-and-white feature film.

There were three silent film adaptations of the story, but this 1922 version is the longest of the three, as well as the only one that survives today. Film critic Christopher Workman states "the obvious day-for-night shooting foreshadows the work of Edward D. Wood Jr. [the film] is a motion picture that wavers between irritating and flat-out dull." He says the Headless Horseman only appears in two all-too-brief sequences in the film, once at the beginning and again in the finale.

Plot 
The village of Sleepy Hollow, New York is getting ready to greet the new schoolteacher, Ichabod Crane, who is coming from New York. Crane has already heard of the village's legendary ghost, a headless horseman who is said to be searching for the head that he lost in battle.

The schoolteacher has barely arrived when he begins to pursue the beautiful young heiress Katrina Van Tassel, angering Abraham Van Brunt (aka "Brom Bones"), who was courting her. Crane's harsh, small-minded approach to teaching also turns some of the villagers against him. Soon, there are many who would like to see him leave the village altogether.

Brom Bones trashes the schoolhouse and tries to make it look like witches allied with Ichabod Crane caused the destruction.

Cast 
 Will Rogers as Ichabod Crane
 Lois Meredith as Katrina Van Tassel
 Ben Hendricks Jr. as Abraham Van Brunt ("Brom Bones")
 Charles E. Graham as Hans Van Ripper
 Mary Foy as Dame Martling
 Bernard A. Reinold as Baltus Van Tassel
 Downing Clarke as  Dominie Heckwelder
 Jerry Devine as Adrian Van Ripper
 James Sheridan as Jethro Martling 
 Kay MacCausland as Elsa Vanderdonck
 Nancy Chase as Gretchen

Production 
The unlikable, stern schoolmaster Ichabod Crane, who at one point beats a student, was played by Rogers, a popular actor playing against his typical roles for which he received $19,583.20. For authenticity, filming took place in the Hudson River Valley around Tarrytown, New York, the setting of Washington Irving's story, with its Dutch farm houses and covered bridges.

The Headless Horseman was the first black-and-white feature film photographed entirely on panchromatic stock, which, while two to three times more expensive, did not have the tendency to turn blue eyes and skies white and lipstick as black like the commonly used orthochromatic film did. One effective special effect was the use of a double exposure to give the headless horseman a phantom-like appearance.

Preservation 
Copies of The Headless Horseman exist in several collections and it has been released on DVD. Alpha Video released the movie in a double-feature with Italian film The Mechanical Man (1921).

References

External links 

 
  with added royalty-free Creative Commons soundtrack
 
 Film still at www.silentfilmstillarchive.com

1922 films
1922 horror films
1920s ghost films
Films about educators
Films based on The Legend of Sleepy Hollow
Films set in Westchester County, New York
Films shot in New York (state)
American silent feature films
American black-and-white films
American horror films
Films distributed by W. W. Hodkinson Corporation
1920s American films
Silent horror films